Arnoldo José Aviles García (born September 13, 1968) is a Honduran politician. A member of the National Party of Honduras, he represents the Francisco Morazan Department and is a deputy of the National Congress of Honduras for 2006–2010.

External links
Profile

Deputies of the National Congress of Honduras
1968 births
Living people
National Party of Honduras politicians
People from Francisco Morazán Department
Place of birth missing (living people)